Humerlito "Bonz" Dolor (born November 27, 1976) is a Filipino politician from Naujan, Oriental Mindoro, and currently the Governor of Oriental Mindoro. He previously served as Vice Governor of the province from 2010 until 2019.

Career 
Dolor served as vice governor of the province for three terms from 2010 until 2019, under Governor Alfonso Umali. He started his political career in his youth as chairperson of Sangguniang Kabataan. In 2001, he was elected as board member for the 1st District of Oriental Mindoro, and served until 2004. He ran for vice governor in 2004, only to lose to Arnan Panaligan. He made a successful comeback in the provincial board in 2007, placing second overall.

Dolor successfully ran for Governor of Oriental Mindoro in the 2019 gubernatorial elections. Running under the PDP–Laban party, He garnered 213,312 votes besting rivals last-termer Second District Representative Reynaldo Umali and Rodolfo Valencia who got 117,617 and 30,923 respectively.

He was re-elected in 2022, defeating Paulino Salvador Leachon.

References

Living people
People from Oriental Mindoro
1976 births
Governors of Oriental Mindoro
PDP–Laban politicians